Seventy Two and Sunny is Uncle Kracker's third studio album, released on Lava Records on June 29, 2004. It is Uncle Kracker's first album not to receive a parental advisory sticker and to feature no rap songs. It is also his last to be released on Lava Records.

Critical reception
Seventy Two and Sunny was met with "mixed or average" reviews from critics. At Metacritic, which assigns a weighted average rating out of 100 to reviews from mainstream publications, this release received an average score of 52 based on 8 reviews.

Among the positive reviews is Chuck Kosterman's take in Spin Magazine, where he writes" You’d have to work pretty hard not to like these songs, though I’m sure some people will try", a reference to the fact that Uncle Kracker was never a critic's darling, despite his record sales. In a review AllMusic, John Luerssen noted the album is "largely absent of originality", while going on to say "like the bulk of Uncle Kracker's second musical helping, it's dang hard to swallow." David Browne's mixed review in Entertainment Weekly said: "Kracker now sees himself as a scruffy Nashville troubadour, and on his third CD, he pulls off the conceit far better than [Kid] Rock has". On a critical note, Brown adds "Kracker's voice is too banal - and his material too mundane - to cut as deeply as his rural heroes."

Track listing

Personnel
 Uncle Kracker – lead vocals
 Mike Bradford – banjo, bass guitar, dobro, acoustic guitar, electric guitar, pedal steel guitar, piano, keyboards, drums, background vocals
 Laurie Melanson – dobro, acoustic guitar, harmonica, hi–string guitar
 Frank J. Myers – acoustic guitar, background vocals
 Dan Dugmore – pedal steel guitar
 Brent Mason – electric guitar
 Eric Gorfain – violin
 John Catchings – cello
 Larry Paxton – double bass
 Richard Baker – piano
 Jerome Day – drums
 Eddie Bayers – drums
 Russ Kunkel – drums
 Annie Ree Bradford – introduction vocals
 Kenny Chesney – lead vocals on "Last Night Again"
 Bret Michaels – background vocals on "Last Night Again"
 Phil Vassar – piano and background vocals on "Writing It Down"

Charts

References

External links 
 Official Uncle Kracker website
 

Uncle Kracker albums
2004 albums
Lava Records albums
Country albums by American artists